Fernando Usero Toledano (born 27 March 1984) is a Spanish professional footballer who plays as a central midfielder.

Football career
Usero was born in Brazatortas, Ciudad Real, Castile-La Mancha. After emerging through Málaga CF's youth ranks, and a brief spell at Atlético Madrid's reserves, he returned to the Andalusians, playing two seasons for the B-team as they were in the second division; additionally, he managed to appear four times for the main squad in the same span, as both were relegated come June 2006 – his La Liga debut came on 9 January 2005, in a 1–2 away loss against Racing de Santander.

Usero then played two years at Málaga neighbours Polideportivo Ejido, playing regularly and being relegated in his second year, after which he signed for another side in the second level, Elche CF. In the summer of 2011, after 247 matches in Spain's division two, he moved abroad for the first time and joined a host of compatriots at Asteras Tripoli F.C. in Greece.

On 19 June 2015, after a four-month loan spell with AD Alcorcón back in his homeland, Usero returned to the Superleague Greece and signed a two-year contract with Atromitos FC.

In August 2018, Usero joined Calvo Sotelo Puertollano. On 22 October 2019 the club confirmed, that Usero had left the club due to personal reasons.

Club statistics

Honours

Club
Asteras Tripoli
Greek Cup runner-up: 2012–13

Individual
Super League Greece Team of the Year 2013–14

References

External links
 
 
 
 
 

1984 births
Living people
Spanish footballers
Footballers from Castilla–La Mancha
Association football midfielders
La Liga players
Segunda División players
Segunda División B players
Tercera División players
Atlético Madrid B players
Atlético Malagueño players
Málaga CF players
Polideportivo Ejido footballers
Elche CF players
Córdoba CF players
AD Alcorcón footballers
CD Mirandés footballers
CD Toledo players
Super League Greece players
Asteras Tripolis F.C. players
Atromitos F.C. players
Spanish expatriate footballers
Expatriate footballers in Greece
Spanish expatriate sportspeople in Greece